Major-General Roland Le Fanu  (13 May 1888 – 2 January 1957) was a senior British Army officer.

Military career
Le Fanu was, after being educated in Germany and briefly serving in the Royal Navy and, later transferring to the Royal Irish Fusiliers of the British Army, was commissioned into the Leicestershire Regiment in 1908. He, like many of his contemporaries, saw service during the First World War, for which he was awarded both the Military Cross and the Distinguished Service Order.

After attending the Staff College, Camberley from 1925 to 1926, alongside Walter Oxley, Raymond Briggs, Francis Tuker, Frank Messervy, Ronald Scobie, John Swayne and the Australian Sydney Rowell, who were among his classmates, he became a staff officer at the War Office in March 1931, and from 1931 to 1932 attended the Royal Naval College, Greenwich. He was then deployed to the Rawalpindi District in India in December 1935. He was appointed a companion of the Distinguished Service Order for his service during the Waziristan campaign. He went on to become General Officer Commanding 15th (Scottish) Infantry Division in August 1939 at the start of the Second World War before retiring in October 1940.

His son, Sir Victor de Fanu, served as Serjeant at Arms of the House of Commons in the 1980s.

References

Bibliography

External links
Generals of World War II

1888 births
1957 deaths
British Army generals of World War II
Royal Leicestershire Regiment officers
Companions of the Distinguished Service Order
Recipients of the Military Cross
British Army major generals
Royal Navy officers
Royal Irish Fusiliers soldiers
British Army personnel of World War I
Graduates of the Staff College, Camberley
Graduates of the Royal Naval College, Greenwich